The women's foil was one of seven fencing events on the fencing at the 1932 Summer Olympics programme. It was the third appearance of the event. The competition was held from 2 to 4 August 1932. 17 fencers from 11 nations competed, with one additional fencer entered but withdrawing.

The competition format was pool play round-robin, with bouts to five touches. Not all bouts were played in some pools if not necessary to determine advancement. Bout wins were used for placement, regardless of losses if fencers had competed in a different number of bouts (e.g., 3–3 Gorordo and 3–2 Every were tied in the first round). Touches against was used as the tie-breaker, except for the tie for the first two places in the final which resulted in a fence-off.

Results

Round 1

The top 5 finishers in each pool advanced to the final.

Pool 1

Pool 2

Final

References

Foil women
1932 in women's fencing
Women's events at the 1932 Summer Olympics